Nephanes is a genus of beetles belonging to the family Ptiliidae.

Species:
 Nephanes euphorbiicola Israelson, 1976 
 Nephanes titan (Newman, 1834)

References

Ptiliidae